Osnabrück University is a public research university located in the city of Osnabrück in Lower Saxony, Germany.

In 2011 it was attended by 11,034 students; the staff of 1,858 consisted of 209 professors, 936 additional academic personnel (lecturers without professorships, post-doctoral researchers and post-graduate assistants) and 713 non-academic personnel. The university is known for its many interdisciplinary degree programmes, some of them rare or even unique among German universities, including European Studies, Migration Research, Applied Systems Science and Cognitive Science. Notably, the university is well known for its research in cognitive science, peace and conflict studies, democratic governance, European Studies, Migration studies among many others.

In addition, the university, through its Master of Arts in Democratic Governance and Civil Society graduate program, is also part of the highly prestigious DAAD Public Policy and Good Governance Scholarships for Developing Countries, along with other reputable institutions in political science and public policy such as the Hertie School of Governance in Berlin and the Willy Brandt School of Public Policy in Erfurt. The program attracts people from Asia, Latin America, and Africa to study in selected German universities for a policy-oriented Master's program.

Former President of Germany, Christian Wulff, is an alumnus of the university.

History 
Higher education began in 1632 in Osnabrück when the Gymnasium Carolinum was upgraded into a Jesuit university. However, the Academia Carolina Osnabrugensis was closed just one year later when Swedish troops recaptured Osnabrück for the Protestant side in the Thirty Years' War.

The government of the state of Lower Saxony decided to set up a university in Osnabrück in 1970, and by 1973 had laid down the legal basis for such an institution. The university opened for the summer semester in 1974 as a successor institution to the Adolf Reichwein Teachers' College, which had occupied the former palace of the Prince-Bishopric since 1953.

Location 

The main building of Osnabrück University is the baroque castle (built 1667–1675), formerly home and office to the Prince-Bishop of Osnabrück, nowadays housing mainly university administration. It is located close to the city center. In summer, the (mostly grass-covered) castle court is used for open air cinema and

concerts.

Most faculty buildings are scattered in close vicinity of the castle. Sport stadium and gymnasium are a bit farther away; the mathematical and natural-scientific faculties as well as the botanical garden are located in the western part of the city in the borough "Westerberg" (the "Western Mountain", which is rather a hill than a mountain). The campus at Westerberg is in parts shared with the neighbouring University of Applied Sciences. The distance between castle and the Westerberg campus is about 1.2 miles.

Departments and Institutes 
Osnabrück University consists of ten schools (Fachbereiche) and four interdisciplinary institutes. Schools are split up into subjects or institutes or both.

The Schools and interdisciplinary institutes are:
 School of Cultural Studies and Social Sciences
 School of Educational and Cultural Studies
 School of Physics
 School of Biology/Chemistry
 School of Mathematics/Computer Science
 School of Language and Literary Studies
 School of Human Sciences
 School of Business Administration and Economics
 School of Law
 Institute of Migration Research and Intercultural Studies
 Institute of Early Modern Intercultural Studies
 Institute of Cognitive Science
 Institute of Environmental Systems Research

See also 

 Academic degree
 Education in Germany
 Fachhochschule
 List of early modern universities in Europe
 List of universities in Germany
 Osnabrück

References

External links 

 
 Osnabrück University Homepage 

Osnabrück University
Educational institutions established in 1974
 
1974 establishments in West Germany